Battle of the Bulge is an iOS historical wargame developed by American studio Shenandoah Studio and released on December 13, 2012.

Critical reception
The game has a Metacritic rating of 85% based on 13 critic reviews.

References

2012 video games
Android (operating system) games
IOS games
PlayStation Network games
Simulation video games
Slitherine Software games
Turn-based strategy video games
Video games developed in the United States
the Bulge (video game)